Charles Napier Lawrence, 1st Baron Lawrence of Kingsgate (27 May 1855 – 17 December 1927), styled The Honourable Charles Lawrence between 1869 and 1923, was a British businessman and railway executive.

Background and education
Lawrence was born in India, the third son of John Lawrence, 1st Baron Lawrence, and Harriette Katherine Hamilton , daughter of Reverend Richard Hamilton. John Lawrence, 2nd Baron Lawrence, and Henry Arnold Lawrence were his brothers. He was educated at Marlborough College.

Career
Lawrence was Chairman of the London and North Western Railway from 1921 to 1923 and of the London, Midland and Scottish Railway from 1923 to 1924 as well as Chairman of the North British and Mercantile Insurance Company and the Antofagasta and Bolivia Railway. In 1915, his portrait was commissioned by the shareholders of Antofagasta and Bolivia Railway in commemoration of his chairmanship of the company, a position he had held since 1908. The portrait was painted by Walter William Ouless. In 1923 he was elevated to the peerage as Baron Lawrence of Kingsgate, of Holland House, Kingsgate, in the County of Kent. He is recorded as having spoken twice in the House of Lords.

Personal life
On 22 June 1881, Lawrence married American Catherine Sumner, only daughter of Frederick Wiggin Sumner of New York City, niece of James W. Gerard and great-niece of General Edwin Vose Sumner. There were no children from the marriage. Lord Lawrence of Kingsgate died in December 1927, aged 72, when the barony became extinct. Lady Lawrence of Kingsgate died 7 November 1934.

Arms

References

External links

1855 births
1927 deaths
Barons in the Peerage of the United Kingdom
Younger sons of barons
People educated at Marlborough College
Directors of the London and North Western Railway
London, Midland and Scottish Railway people
Barons created by George V